Microtomus is a genus of assassin bugs in the family Reduviidae. There are about 10 described species in Microtomus.

Species
These 10 species belong to the genus Microtomus:
 Microtomus conspicillaris (Drury, 1782)
 Microtomus gayi (Spinola, 1852)
 Microtomus kuntzeni Stichel, 1926
 Microtomus luctuosus (Stål, 1854)
 Microtomus lunifer (Berg, 1900)
 Microtomus maculatus Stichel, 1926
 Microtomus pessoai Lent & Suárez, 1956
 Microtomus pintoi Lima, 1935
 Microtomus purcis (Drury, 1782)
 Microtomus tibialis Stichel, 1926

References

Further reading

External links

 

Reduviidae
Articles created by Qbugbot